Yesterday's Guys Used No Arsenic is a 1976 Argentine black comedy crime film directed by José A. Martínez Suárez. The film was selected as the Argentine entry for the Best Foreign Language Film at the 49th Academy Awards, but was not accepted as a nominee.

Cast
 Mecha Ortiz as Mara Ordaz
 Arturo García Buhr as Pedro
 Narciso Ibáñez Menta as Norberto
 Mario Soffici as Martín
 Bárbara Mujica as Laura

See also
 List of submissions to the 49th Academy Awards for Best Foreign Language Film
 List of Argentine submissions for the Academy Award for Best Foreign Language Film

References

External links
 

1976 films
1970s Spanish-language films
1970s crime comedy films
Films directed by José A. Martínez Suárez
Argentine crime comedy films
1970s Argentine films